The East London line is part of the London Overground, running north to south through the East, Docklands and South areas of London. It was previously a line of the London Underground.

Built in 1869 by the East London Railway Company, which reused the Thames Tunnel intended for horse-drawn carriages, the line became part of the London Underground network in 1933. After nearly 75 years as part of that network, it closed on 22 December 2007 for an extensive refurbishment and expansion, reopening as part of the Overground network in April 2010.

History

Establishment of the East London Railway
The East London Railway was created by the East London Railway Company, a consortium of six railway companies: the Great Eastern Railway (GER), the London, Brighton and South Coast Railway (LB&SCR), the London, Chatham and Dover Railway (LCDR), the South Eastern Railway (SER), the Metropolitan Railway, and the District Railway. The latter two operated what are now the Metropolitan, Circle, District and Hammersmith & City lines of the London Underground. The incorporation of the ELR took place on 26 May 1865 with the aim of providing a link between the LB&SCR, GER and SER lines.

The companies reused the Thames Tunnel, built by Marc and Isambard Kingdom Brunel between 1825 and 1843 for horse-drawn carriages. The tunnel, with generous headroom and two carriageways separated by arches, connected Wapping on the north bank of the Thames with Rotherhithe on the south bank. A triumph of civil engineering, it was a commercial failure and by the 1860s it had become an unpleasant and disreputable place.

The tunnel was the most easterly land connection between the north and south banks of the Thames, close to the docks on both banks of the river, and was not far from mainline railways at either end. Converting the tunnel for railway use thus offered a means of providing a cross-Thames rail link. On 25 September 1865 the East London Railway Company took ownership of the tunnel at a cost of £800,000. Over the next four years the company built a railway through the tunnel to connect with the existing lines. The company's engineer was Sir John Hawkshaw, who was also responsible for the major re-design and completion of I K Brunel's long-abandoned Clifton Suspension Bridge at Bristol.

The line opened in stages as financing became available:

 13 March 1871: A spur opened from just south of what is now Surrey Quays station to the South London line's Old Kent Road station. Passenger services were withdrawn from 1 June 1911 and freight last used the line in 1964; the track was subsequently removed. This alignment was relaid and restored to passenger service by London Overground in late 2012.
 3 March 1884: A spur to the Metropolitan and Metropolitan District Railways opened south of Whitechapel using St Mary's Curve. This enabled Metropolitan Railway and Metropolitan District Railway (District) trains to commence through services to the East London Railway later that year. Although passenger services via this spur ceased in 1939, it was retained to transfer empty trains to the rest of the sub-surface network.

Early use

The East London Railway Company owned the infrastructure but it was operated by its controlling railways. Steam trains were initially operated by the GER, LB&SCR and the SER. The LB&SCR used its LBSCR A1 Class Terrier locomotives, which William Stroudley designed partly with this line in mind. From March to September 1884 the SER service ran from Addiscombe to St Mary's (MR & MDR Joint Station).

Before the development of the Kent coalfields in the early part of the 20th century, house coal from the north for distribution in south London and as far afield as Maidstone and Brighton was an important source of revenue. Access at the north end of the line was difficult: trains were limited to 26 wagons and had to be shunted into the Great Eastern's Liverpool Street station and drawn forward onto the ELR. To avoid this reversal, a line was planned from the ELR north of Whitechapel to the GER at Bethnal Green. Acts for this were passed in 1866 and 1868. When the GER route to Hackney Downs Junction, now Hackney Downs, was constructed in 1872, the route was altered to connect at Cambridge Heath, with an abandonment Act for the previous route in 1871 and two new Acts in 1876 and 1877. A short length of the latter tunnel was built, and from October 1900 additional capacity was offered by a wagon lift, carrying two ten-ton wagons, from the Great Eastern coal depot at Spitalfields to a siding laid in the tunnel stub. The surface junction was taken up in 1966 and the lift closed in 1967, after a fire at the Spitalfields depot.

When the Metropolitan District Railway was electrified in 1905 it ceased using the ELR, the last trains running on 31 July 1905; the Metropolitan Railway suspended its service after 2 December 1906. LB&SCR and GER services continued, and SER services recommenced on 3 December 1906.

The line was electrified, with the controlling railways funding the upgrade and the Metropolitan Railway providing the rolling stock.

After the 1923 grouping the goods service was operated by London and North Eastern Railway (as successors to the GER), with the Metropolitan Railway continuing to provide passenger services.

London Underground era

In 1933, the East London Railway came under the control of the London Passenger Transport Board. Although the infrastructure was still privately owned, passenger services were operated as the "East London Branch" of the Metropolitan line. The railways were nationalised in 1948, and became part of the British Transport Commission along with the Underground. Goods services continued to use the line until 1962, with occasional passenger trains from Liverpool Street until 1966. The short length of track connecting Shoreditch to Liverpool St was removed in 1966. The service to Shoreditch was reduced, with  becoming the northern terminus for much of the time; by the time  station closed in 2006, it was only open at peak times on weekdays and most of Sundays (for Brick Lane Market).

Services to and from stations further west were curtailed during the early part of the Underground era. The service to Hammersmith was reduced to peak hours only in 1936 and withdrawn in 1939, leaving the East London branch as an isolated line. Its only passenger interchange to the rest of the Underground was at Whitechapel, with interchanges to main line trains at the two New Cross stations. The line was closed entirely between March 1995 and March 1998 for major maintenance and refurbishment works, during which time a rail-replacement bus service operated.

The identity of the East London line changed considerably during the London Underground era. On Tube maps between 1933 and 1968 it was depicted in the same colour as the Metropolitan line. In 1970, it was renamed the "Metropolitan line — East London Section", in Metropolitan line purple with a white stripe down the middle. In the 1980s it became a line in its own right (though it was still grouped operationally with the Metropolitan line) and from 1990 its colour on the map changed to orange. In 1995, London Underground threatened to close the line if it did not receive listed building consent from the London Docklands Development Corporation for the shotcreting of four arches of Thames Tunnel. Maintenance passed to the Metronet consortium in 2003 under a public-private partnership, although the operation of trains continued to be the responsibility of Transport for London (TfL). According to TfL, the line carried 10.7 million passengers per year before its temporary closure in 2007.

Physical characteristics
The line was the only Underground line not to penetrate Travelcard Zone 1 and (apart from the Moorgate to Finsbury Park service, transferred to British Rail in 1976) the only line designed and constructed for mainline trains. At  in length it was the second-shortest line (after the Waterloo & City line), with nine stations and an end-to-end journey time of 14 minutes. It ran in tunnel from Whitechapel to Surrey Quays, with the remainder on the surface or in cutting. Whilst much of the line was built as cut-and-cover, it also contained overground and tube construction features.

It connected with South Eastern Main Line services at New Cross and Brighton Main Line services at New Cross Gate. Underground connections were at Canada Water (Jubilee line) and Whitechapel (District and Hammersmith & City Lines). Although the interchange was via the street, through ticketing was permitted.

A link with the Metropolitan and District lines was made just south of Whitechapel via St Mary's Curve. This has been out of passenger use since 1939 but was still used to transfer rolling stock to and from the Metropolitan line's main depot at Neasden. The curve can easily be seen on the northbound and eastbound approaches to Whitechapel station, although a temporary wall was built across the line in January 2008, close to the junction with the District line..

Most of the line was double track, with Shoreditch station and the final sections into the southern termini single track, the latter because of lack of space. This required trains to alternate between the two southern termini.

Rolling stock
The line used Metropolitan line A60 and A62 sub-surface rolling stock built by Cravens of Sheffield in two batches between 1960 and 1962. It was upgraded between 1995 and 1998 with improved suspension, lighting, heating and ventilation. The rolling stock was regularly interchanged with that used on the main Metropolitan line and usually carried both East London and Metropolitan line maps, but ELL trains were four-car units with a driving cab at each end, unlike Metropolitan line trains, which, aside from the Chesham shuttle, ran as eight-car trains. Metropolitan line trains were mostly two single-ended units coupled together with fully operational driving cabs at each end: the Met could use any ELL trains, but the ELL could use only double-ended units.

Seven four-car trains operated the line (six off-peak, seven during peak hours when Shoreditch was open). Off peak, train seven became the spare. The line operated some of the shortest trains on the network, necessitated by short platforms. The small number of trains made the line particularly sensitive to disruption caused by vandalism, train faults or staff shortages. Sometimes in the early 2000s only two trains were running. Trains were operated by just a driver: the decision to withdraw the guards prompted an unsuccessful strike by the National Union of Railwaymen in May 1985.

Light maintenance and stabling took place at a small depot near New Cross, with heavier work at the main Metropolitan line depot at Neasden. Between 1985 and 1987, D78 stock operated the line before being replaced by A60 and A62 stock.  During the 1970s the line was operated by 1938 Tube stock.

Stations
The stations in operation during most of the London Underground era, in order from north to south, were as follows:

Conversion to Overground 

Engineering work on the East London line extension started in 2005 and the underground service ended in December 2007.

In 2007 London Buses route ELW Whitechapel – Shadwell – Wapping was introduced, operating every 10 minutes, every 15 minutes at evenings and weekends. It was operated with route-branded single-deck buses. Starting on 23 December 2007 it was extended from Whitechapel to Shoreditch (Monday-Friday 07:00-10:30 & 15:30–20:30, Sunday 07:00-15:30) from 19 July 2008. The frequency of the route was cut to four buses per hour in September 2009. It was reduced to weekends-only from 28 April 2010, and withdrawn on 9 May 2010.

Between 2006 and May 2008 other rail replacement buses were provided. Route ELS Whitechapel – Shoreditch (Monday-Friday 07:00-10:30 & 15:30–20:30, Sunday 07:00-15:30) commenced 10 June 2006 and was withdrawn on 19 July 2008. It was replaced by a peak-hour extension of route ELW.

London Buses route ELC New Cross Gate – New Cross – Surrey Quays – Canada Water (Monday-Friday every 5–10 minutes, weekends every 15 minutes) started on 23 December 2007. It was withdrawn on 25 September 2009 following a 40% drop in passenger numbers. Transport for London estimated that this saved around £1 million over the period to June 2010.

London Buses route ELP Canada Water – Rotherhithe (every 15 minutes) began on 23 December 2007 and was withdrawn on 24 February 2008 due to lack of use: tickets were valid between Bermondsey and Canada Water on standard route 381.

Unlike the previous East London line closure, no replacement bus service was provided across the River Thames through the Rotherhithe Tunnel. London Transport was concerned that demand would be so high and buses would be so small that the frequency could have to be one bus every 30 seconds. However, by 2007 no such vehicles were commercially available that were low-floor compliant: the only ones with this width, as previously used, were minibuses with higher floors. As bus policy by this time was 100% low floor, it meant that no such service could be provided.

A limited train service was introduced on 27 April 2010 and full service began on 23 May 2010.

History of the extended route
Mostly on viaduct, the route from Highbury and Islington to Shoreditch was opened in 1865. It was constructed by the North London Railway as its city branch to allow its passenger trains to reach the City of London.  As originally built the line had four stations, at Dalston Junction, Haggerston, Shoreditch and a large terminus at Broad Street. At Dalston Junction, a line branched to the North London line eastwards, allowing services to Hackney, Bow and Poplar (East India Road). This route closed to passengers in 1944 and goods on 4 July 1966.

At its peak, Broad Street was the third-busiest station in London (after Liverpool Street and Victoria). At the start of the 20th century, more than one train per minute arrived or departed Broad Street during rush hour, with over 27 million passengers in 1902. Intermediate station traffic stagnated due to bus and tram competition, and Haggerston and Shoreditch stations were closed in 1940 following bomb damage in World War II. The line remained busy up to the 1950s, receiving traffic from the East Coast Main Line, West Coast Main Line and other routes. However, it declined following the war and was closed on 30 June 1986. While Broad Street station's site was immediately sold for office use, becoming the Broadgate development, the route north was mothballed. The present Haggerston and Dalston Junction stations have been built next to and on the original sites, but Shoreditch High Street station is on a new alignment connecting the two routes.

Extension

Phase 1

It was extended south to connect to the  arm of the Brighton Main Line, linked via a northbound flyover north of New Cross Gate.

The official opening of most of phase 1 of the East London line extension took place on 23 May 2010. Use of the line was forecast to increase from the previous 10.4 million passengers per year to 35.4 million, and to 50 million when phase 2 is finished. Transport for London acquired 20 new four-car  Bombardier Capitalstar electric multiple units to operate on the line. Unlike the dual-voltage 378s on the North London and West London lines, the East London line units can only receive power from the third rail electrification, although, like all modern EMUs, they have the potential to be retro-fitted.

The track and the northern extension remain under TfL ownership, and the stations from Dalston Junction to Surrey Quays are part of the London Overground network.

Highbury & Islington extension

The first train, with headcode 9A20, was the 09:55 Highbury & Islington – Crystal Palace, which departed on time from platform 2 and was formed of a four-car class 378 unit.

East London line extension phase 2
The service from Highbury & Islington to Clapham Junction commenced on 9 December 2012. There are three services per day that run from Wandsworth Road to Battersea Park to maintain a service along that route as a parliamentary train.

The extension uses an alignment between Surrey Quays and Queens Road Peckham stations that had not seen services since 1913. The "new" section diverges from the East London line south of Surrey Quays station and joins the South London line just north of the closed Old Kent Road station. The route skirts the Bridgehouse Meadows public open space; this was used as the construction site, then restored to public use after completion. The former pedestrian bridge and support piers over Surrey Canal Road were demolished as a precursor to building the railway bridge. The planned lowering of Surrey Canal Road and associated work to the services were not carried out as a higher elevation was adopted, with a 1 in 30 (3.3 per cent) incline allowing the railway to cross at a suitable height.

Future 
To cope with increased demand, the class 378 units which operate on the line have been extended to five cars. Although the new stations on the line have platforms which are either at least five cars long or provide space for platform extensions, some stations cannot be extended and so selective door opening is required.

Service
The current London Overground service is 16 trains per hour in each direction. Northbound trains terminate at Highbury & Islington or Dalston Junction (8tph each). Southbound trains terminate at  West Croydon, Crystal Palace, New Cross and Clapham Junction (4tph each).

A Friday and Saturday night service was introduced between Dalston Junction and New Cross Gate (not stopping at Whitechapel) from December 2017.

References

Various sources have been used in the creation of this article, including the external links below, email conversations with the ELL Project Team and emails from the ELL Project Team update newsletter.

Further reading
 Wayne Asher. 2015. A Very Political Railway – the rescue of the North London Line. 
 John Glover. 2013. London's Overground.

External links

East London line Project (official home page)
Video Flyover of Phase 1
Photos of the East London Line and Thames Tunnel while still London Underground

Closed London Underground lines
Railway lines in London
London Overground
Croydon 2020
Transport in the London Borough of Croydon
Transport in the London Borough of Tower Hamlets
Transport in the London Borough of Southwark
Transport in the London Borough of Lewisham
Transport in the London Borough of Lambeth
Transport in the London Borough of Wandsworth
Transport in the London Borough of Hackney
Transport in the London Borough of Bromley
Transport in the London Borough of Islington
Proposed rail infrastructure in London
750 V DC railway electrification
Railway lines opened in 1869
Standard gauge railways in London
1869 establishments in England
British joint railway companies